Claire Johnston (born 22 February 1979) is a Scottish international lawn and indoor bowler.

Bowls career
Johnston is from Irvine, North Ayrshire, in Scotland and won a bronze medal in the pairs at the 2012 World Outdoor Bowls Championship with Margaret Letham.

In 2011 she won the pairs gold medal and singles bronze medal at the Atlantic Bowls Championships and four years later she won the fours gold medal at the 2015 Atlantic Bowls Championships.

Johnston gained major indoor honours when winning the mixed pairs title at the 2017 World Indoor Bowls Championship with Nick Brett of England. In 2018 she was selected as part of the Scottish team for the 2018 Commonwealth Games on the Gold Coast in Queensland where she won a bronze medal in the Pairs with Lesley Doig.

In 2019 she won the Scottish National Bowls Championships pairs title with Hannah Smith. and also won the triples silver medal and fours bronze medal at the Atlantic Bowls Championships. In 2022, she won the pairs title at the British Isles Bowls Championships in Llandrindod Wells.

In 2022, she competed in the women's pairs and the Women's fours at the 2022 Commonwealth Games.

References 

Scottish female bowls players
1979 births
Living people
Indoor Bowls World Champions
Commonwealth Games bronze medallists for Scotland
Commonwealth Games medallists in lawn bowls
Bowls players at the 2018 Commonwealth Games
Bowls players at the 2022 Commonwealth Games
Medallists at the 2018 Commonwealth Games